Flora Creek is a stream in Cape Girardeau County in the U.S. state of Missouri.

Flora Creek most likely was named after a pioneer citizen.

See also
List of rivers of Missouri

References

Rivers of Cape Girardeau County, Missouri
Rivers of Missouri